Malyi (meaning "little", "small") may refer to:

 Malyi (surname)
 Mályi, village in northeastern Hungary
 Malyi Bereznyi (border control)
 Malyi Kuchuriv, village in western Ukraine
 Malyi Sasyk Lagoon, lagoon in southern Ukraine
 Malyi Seret, river in western Ukraine
 Cape Malyi Fontan, cape in southern Ukraine

See also
 
 Maly (disambiguation)